Nicolás Javier López Fernández (born March 16, 1983) is a Chilean film director, producer and screenwriter. He is known for comedies such as Promedio Rojo (2004), the Qué pena trilogy (2010-2012), and the Paz Bascuñán vehicles Sin filtro (2016) and No estoy loca (2018). In June 2018, a few months after López begun working on a film project about the MeToo movement, the magazine Sábado of El Mercurio published a report where various actresses made claims of sexual and workplace abuses against him. In an ensuing trial, López was in 2022 found guilty of two sexual abuse charges and sentenced to five years and one day in prison.

Life and work
López became interested in filmmaking at a young age. After reading Robert Rodriguez's Rebel Without a Crew (1995) and watching Kevin Smith's Clerks (1994), he began experimenting with his family's video camera. By the age of 12, he was already writing a column for El Mercurio, one of the most prestigious and conservative right-wing Chilean newspapers. His column, "Memorias de un Pingüino" ("Memories of a Penguin"), ran from 1997 to 1999 and described the life of a student, commonly known as a "penguin" in Chile because of the typical black and white uniform. The comments he made in the column led to him being expelled from school. At the age of 14, after his expulsion, he began a new column called "López" with a more mature style.

At the age of 15, López made his debut at the Valdivia Film Festival with the short film Pajero (“wanker”), which tells the story of a teenager constantly interrupted during masturbation. The next year he filmed Superhéroes, the story of a teenager who tries to convince people that he is a superhero, and in 2000 he filmed Florofilia, a love story between a man and a plant. He became partner and co-founder of sobras.com, a website about cinema, television, books, comics and video games that focused on young audiences. He then founded the first independent film festival in Santiago, the "Sobras Independent Film Festival", as well as Sobras.com Producciones, a film production company. As associate producer, López took charge of the marketing of Jorge Olguín's horror movie Ángel Negro in 2000, and the adult animation Cesante (“unemployed”), which he co-wrote. He also ran the marketing for other Chilean films such as Olguín's Sangre Eterna (2002) and Orlando Lübbert's Taxi para tres (2001). He co-directed many music videos, and won an MTV Latin Music Award in 2002 for "Mujer Robusta" by Sinergia. He co-wrote the 2003 edition of the MTV Latin Music Award and, also in 2003, he directed, co-wrote and acted in an absurd comedy series for the same network, called Piloto MTV, along with Eduardo Bertrán.

At the age of 20, López directed his first feature film, Promedio Rojo (2004), an absurdist romantic comedy about teenage nerds, in which the main character slips in and out of reality, with the ‘unreal’ scenes animated. He won the special jury prize at the Viña del Mar International Film Festival, and featured in the Mar del Plata International Film Festival and LA Film Fest. Although the film was criticized in his native country, it caught the attention of international directors and other industry personalities including Salma Hayek, Alfonso Cuaron, Alejandro González Iñárritu and Guillermo del Toro. In 2005, and with a bigger budget, López began working on Santos, a film about a failed comic artist. Released in 2008, the film was poorly received by critics and did not fulfill its financial expectations. In 2010, after the failure of Santos, López wrote and directed his highest-grossing film yet, Qué pena tu vida, spawning two sequels and building a cast of regular actors such as Ariel Levy, Paz Bascuñán, Lorenza Izzo, Andrea Velasco, Ignacia Allamand, Nicolás Martínez, Ramón Llao and Alison Mandel.

In 2012, López partnered with the American director Eli Roth to release Aftershock, a Chilean-American disaster movie loosely inspired by events that took place during the 2010 Chile earthquake. It was López's first English-language film and was produced for his company Sobras, by Roth, Miguel Asensio and Brian Oliver. The movie debuted at the Toronto International Film Festival. Following the box-office underperformance of Aftershock, The Green Inferno (2013) and Knock, Knock (2015), López put his "Chilewood" ambitions with Roth on hold and returned to bawdy comedy, scoring huge hits with Sin filtro (2016), Hazlo como hombre (2017) and No estoy loca (2018).

On 30 June 2018, eight Chilean actresses and models accused López of sexual harassment and workplace bullying. The following day Netflix announced it was putting its deal with Sobras "under review" and López himself posted a video online stating he was resigning from Sobras and that he would defend himself against the allegations: "I don’t understand what is happening nor the break in my years-long relationships of trust and affection. If I sometimes have been misunderstood, I apologize. But I’m not a stalker nor an abuser." On 26 April 2022, López was found guilty of two sexual abuse charges, and on 16 May was sentenced to five years and one day in jail.

Awards
Sitges - Catalan International Film Festival
Nominated, Grand Prize of European Fantasy Film in Silver, Official Fantàstic Panorama Selection, Mis peores amigos: Promedio Rojo, El regreso (2013)
Nominated, Maria, Best Motion Picture, Aftershock (2012)

Tokyo International Film Festival
Nominated, Tokyo Grand Prix, Promedio Rojo (2004)

Viña del Mar International Film Festival
Won, Special Jury Award, Promedio Rojo (2004)

Filmography

Film

Producer only

Short film

Television

Webseries

Music videos 
Mujer robusta - Sinergia, with Eduardo Bertrán (2002)
Concurso - Sinergia, with Eduardo Bertrán (2002)
Chilerobot - Sinergia, with Eduardo Bertrán (2003)
Te quiero ver muerta - Tiro Al Aire, with Eduardo Bertrán
Traigo el aguante - Santo Barrio, with Eduardo Bertrán (2002)
Toma lo que quieras - Claudio Quiñones, with Eduardo Bertrán

See also
 Cinema of Chile

References

External links
 Nicolás López’ production company
 Nicolás López datasheet at Cinechile

Chilean film directors
Chilean film producers
Living people
Chilean screenwriters
Male screenwriters
Chilean male film actors
Chilean male comedians
1983 births
People from Santiago
Chilean male television actors
People convicted of sexual assault